ABC iview is a video on demand and catch-up TV service run by the Australian Broadcasting Corporation. Currently iview video content can only be viewed by users in Australia. As of 2016, ABC iview attracts around 50 million plays monthly and accounts for around half of the total time streamed by Australian TV video services.

History 
After running for several months in beta form under the name "ABC Playback", the service became available as a Flash website in July 2008. This was the next step after the video podcasting of ABC TV programs since July 2006.

The iview Flash website was redesigned in 2009 and 2010, to cater for a large increase in content. 

An iOS app for iPads was launched in December 2010, followed by a mobile version for iPhone in June 2012. An iview Android app supporting phones and tablets on Android 4.0.3 and above was released on 18 December 2013.

Over the following years, iview was released to a range of Smart TVs, games consoles and other devices.

Content and programming 
ABC iview provides on-demand access to almost all the TV programs that are broadcast on the ABC's linear broadcast channels (ABC TV, ABC TV Plus, ABC Me, ABC Kids, ABC News), as well as simulcast live streams of those channels and original content and programs acquired exclusively for ABC iview.

Programs are categorised by these genres:
 Arts
 Culture
 Comedy
 Documentary
 Drama
 Education
 Lifestyle
 News and current affairs
 Panel and discussion
 Regional Australia
 Sport
In September 2015, the ABC added a dedicated Arts channel to iview.

Some shows premiere on iview before they feature on broadcast television, such as Rake and the BBC's Class.

Live streams 
 In late 2010, a live stream of ABC News 24 was made available on the iview website, and then subsequently on iOS and Android apps.
 On 1 December 2015, a simulcast live stream of the main ABC TV channel was added to the iview website, iOS and Android apps.
 On 18 July 2016, the ABC added simulcast live streams for all the remaining broadcast channels (ABC2/ABC Kids, ABC3).
On 1 May 2018, the ABC added state-based streams (VIC, QLD, TAS, NT, NSW, WA, SA, ACT) of ABC main channel.kiaojj

Devices and access

Website 
The iview website streams video at up to 4,500Kbps using HTML5 based technology.

Mobile devices  
Apple iPad (from 2010)
Apple iPhone and iPod Touch (from 2012)
 Android phones and tablets on Android v5.0 and above (from 2019)

Smart TVs 
 Sony Bravia 
 Samsung Smart TVs ("Orsay") (from 2011) and Samsung Tizen OS (from 2015)
 Panasonic Viera Cast (from 2011)
 LG Netcast (from 2011) & WebOS (from 2014)
 FreeviewPlus certified (HbbTV) devices (from 2014)
 Hisense Smart TVs (from February 2020)

Video game consoles 
 Microsoft Xbox 360 (2011-2018)
 Microsoft Xbox One (from 2015)
 Microsoft Xbox Series X/S (from 2020)
 Sony PlayStation 3 (from 2008)
 Sony PlayStation 4 (from 2015)
 Sony PlayStation 5 (from 2020)

Media streamers 
 Foxtel IQ (from 2019)
 Apple TV 4th generation and later (from March 2016)
 Telstra TV (from December 2015)
 Fetch TV (from 2013)
 Chromecast devices

Offline viewing 
Unlike the ABC's podcasts, programs on the iview service are not officially downloadable and are only available to watch for a short time after the program has aired on the ABC.

In 2012 the ABC sent a legal notice to the author of an open source program called Python-iView which enabled users to download videos from the ABC.  Other download tools such as youtube-dl continue to claim support for unofficially downloading from the site.

Unmetering 
In late 2008 the iview website video player was updated to allow for unmetering (zero-rating) by several Australian ISPs through network peering arrangements. The ISPs included Internode, iPrimus, Westnet, Apex Internet and Adam Internet. iiNet was able to offer iview unmetered without the peering upgrade. In addition, AARNet, Cinenet, and Comcen since offer unmetered access to iview. ABC TV live streams and content not streamed using Adobe Flash (i.e. through the iPad and Internet connected TVs) is currently not unmetered, however this may change in the future.

In October 2016, Optus added ABC iview to their zero-rating offer for Optus mobile customers.

See also

Internet television in Australia
List of Internet television providers
List of streaming media services

References

External links

Media players
Australian Broadcasting Corporation television
Internet television channels
Mass media companies established in 2008
Australian companies established in 2008
Australian streaming companies
PlayStation 4 software
Xbox One software